Archbishop Simeon (secular name Radivoj Jakovlevič; born 12 February 1926 in Prague) is an Eastern Orthodox bishop.

He studied theology in Prague, Belgrade, and Leningrad. He taught in theological faculties, especially regarding the Old Testament. In 1958, he was ordained a deacon and a priest. On 21 June 1998, he received his episcopal consecration in Saints Cyril and Methodius Cathedral. On 9 April 2000, he was appointed as the bishop of Brno and Olomouc. On 12 February 2006, he was elevated to the rank of Archbishop.

On 12 April 2013, after the resignation of Metropolitan , Simeon temporarily became the Locum Tenens (ad interim administrator) of the Czech and Slovak Orthodox Church, as the eldest bishop of the Church, until a new metropolitan could be elected. As a result of the intra-church conflict, his position has become controversial.

On 9 December 2013, he was relieved of his position as Locum Tenens, and replaced by Metropolitan Rastislav. On 11 January 2014, Rastislav was elected as the new primate of the Czech and Slovak Orthodox Church, which was recognized by some Eastern Orthodox churches including the Russian Orthodox Church. However, the Ecumenical Patriarchate of Constantinople still considers the position as vacant, and Simeon as the current Locum Tenens.

In early March 2014, negotiations were held in the patriarchal residence of Constantinople in Phanar between Archbishop Simeon, Archbishop Rastislav, Bishops George and Joachim, but the dialogue was unsuccessful.

References

1926 births
Living people
20th-century Eastern Orthodox priests
21st-century Eastern Orthodox archbishops
Bishops of the Czech and Slovak Orthodox Church
Eastern Orthodox Christians from the Czech Republic
Clergy from Prague
Czech people of Serbian descent
Recipients of the Order of Prince Yaroslav the Wise, 1st class
Eastern Orthodox bishops in Europe